Malcha Kalyan Samiti is a nonprofit organisation based mainly in India (Haryana, Sonipat). The organisation works for the poor children of India who are orphans or their parents cannot get them education. Malcha Kalyan Samiti has completed many works for the betterment of society and a better future for children. It was founded by Mohammed Arif On 24 October 2014 when he saw a need for a change in society. Malcha Kalyan Samiti wants a change in society and has done many works for the country.

Programs
Malcha Kalyan Samiti has done many big works for children and the environment.

Helping poor students

On 25 January 2013 Malcha Kalyan Samiti did its first program in which it distributed sweaters, tiffin boxes, school bags, geometry boxes to more than 1200 students in Sonipat, in which Dr. Aditya Arya was present and many schools were present.

Malcha Kalyan Samiti prize distribution ceremony

On 18 May 2013 Malcha Kalyan Samiti organised a prize distribution ceremony and gave medals to 1st 2nd and 3rd and gave them copies and for their better future. in that program Dr. Aditya Arya and Ig Surajbhan Kajal was present in that program to help its organisation.

Podharopan (planting saplings)

On 30 September 2013 the organisation initiated a program in which its team planted more than 100 trees in 100 schools with a joint venture with crpf
Subsidiaries - Sajjan Singh - Chairman (Malcha Welfare Committee), Gbrudin (Blood Donor), Mr Ramphal, Azad Singh , Thakur Inder Singh, Zorawar Singh, Kapil thakran, Vikramjeet, Joginder Singh, his son-in-law Raj Singh, Vaid Krmbir, Singh, Rajbir, Sudesh, Renu Devi, Saroj Devi, Kiran, Kirti ETC.

15 August
On 15 August 2014 Malcha Kalyan Samiti arranged a program in the government school of Sonipat to create awareness of country and the freedom fighters who died for our country. Malcha Kalyan Samiti president told them that they are breathing in this environment because thousands of freedom fighters died for their better future.

The team

Malcha Kalyan Samiti have a team of more than 70 members in which do all of the work in a group and are always ready to do any social work that the organisation does.

History

Malcha Kalyan Samiti was founded by Sajjan Singh on 17 October 2013 for a change in society and the case in New Delhi in which the land which is not acquired with rules and Regulations in 1911-12 for making the new city of India.
 The collector passed Awards No. 30, 31, 32, 33 and 34 during December 1912 and declared permanent acquisition of whole village Malcha and abadis of Malcha and Tal Katora. A list of villagers was prepared for compensation amount which they have been entitled to 11.99 acres of abadi (where people live).  Compensation for change of residence villagers should be given 5 rupees to every family whereas there are 107 housed they have to give 525 rupees. Many people fled their lives only some are their to stand and collect compensation but people never received compensation but Acquisition officer showed it deposited to divisional judge of Delhi.

The acquisition was under the Land and Acquisition Act, in which it was written that if the land is not used for any of the construction purposes then it will be given back to the villagers and first which would receive the land will be Nambardar.
Still, there are acres of land which have still not been used for any construction and have not been given to the villagers.

References

External links
 Official Website
 THE NATIVE STRIKE AT RAJ 

Non-profit organisations based in India